Joaquim Aurélio Barreto Nabuco de Araújo (August 19, 1849 – January 17, 1910) was a Brazilian writer, statesman, and a leading voice in the abolitionist movement of his country.

Early life and education
Born in Brazil, Joaquim was the son of a major political figure in the Brazilian Empire, Jose Thomas Nabuco (1813–1878), a lifetime senator, counselor of state, and wealthy landowner.  Jose made his move from conservativism to liberalism in the 1860s, establishing the Liberal Party in 1868 and supporting the reforms that would lead to the abolition of slavery in 1888.

Personal life
Joaquim Nabuco spent most of his time from 1873 to 1878 traveling and living abroad. In his youth, Nabuco had a 14-year relationship with financier and philanthropist Eufrásia Teixeira Leite, who held one of the largest fortunes in the world at the time. The romance with Nabuco begun during a trip by ship to Europe, in 1873, and would last until 1887, when Eufrásia sent her last letter to Joaquim Nabuco. Two years later, at 38 years old, he married Evelina Torres Soares Ribeiro. Nabuco was a friend of the famous writer Machado de Assis.

Career

After returning to Brazil in 1878, Nabuco began his public fight against slavery through his political activity and in his writings. He campaigned against slavery in the Chamber of Deputies from 1878, and he founded the Brazilian Anti-Slavery Society. In 1883, he wrote probably the most important work against slavery in the Portuguese language: O Abolicionismo. Although he was largely responsible for the abolition of slavery in 1888, contemporary affirmative action intellectuals believe his reasons for doing so were related to an elitist fear of slavery "Africanizing" Brazil. He is quoted as saying, "Free labor and slave labor cannot coexist, and neither can slavery and immigration". However, it is hard to explain, under this view, why Nabuco would want Africans to become free citizens when slave traffic had already been prohibited.

After the overthrow of the Brazilian monarchy he retired from public life for a period of time.

He later became the first ambassador from Brazil to the United States from 1905–1910, which marked a significant shift in his country's role in the world arena. Nabuco realized the importance for Brazil, and other South American nations, to develop a united relationship with the North American stage. In Washington, he worked with Elihu Root who also supported this idea of Pan-Americanism. He spent many years in both England and France, where he was a strong proponent of Pan-Americanism, presiding over the 1906 Pan-Americanism conference. Following Nabuco's death on January 17, 1910, the Pan-American Building in Washington, D.C. was finally completed. At the dedication ceremony the Secretary of State said the following words about him:  “One voice that should have spoken here today is silent, but many of us cannot forget or cease to mourn and to honor our dear and noble friend, Joaquim Nabuco. Ambassador from Brazil, dean of the American diplomatic corps, respected, admired, trusted, loved and followed by all of us, he was a commanding figure in the international movement of which the creation of this building is part…”

His best known work is his autobiography Minha formação, published in 1900. It vividly portrays the slave-holding society in 19th century Brazil.

Of his major works, Minha formação and O abolicionismo have been translated into English, as My Formative Years and Abolitionism respectively.

References

External links

1849 births
1910 deaths
People from Recife
Brazilian diplomats
Ambassadors of Brazil to the United States
Ambassadors of Brazil to the United Kingdom
Brazilian autobiographers
Brazilian people of Portuguese descent
Joaquim Aurelio Barreto Nabuco de Araujo
Christian abolitionists
Members of the Brazilian Academy of Letters
Brazilian monarchists
Liberal Party (Brazil) politicians